The 1852 United States presidential election in Wisconsin was held on November 2, 1852 as part of the 1852 United States presidential election. State voters chose five electors to the Electoral College, who voted for President and Vice President.

Democratic Party candidate Franklin Pierce won the state with 52.04 percent of the popular vote, winning Wisconsin's five electoral votes.

This would be the final time a Democratic presidential candidate would win Wisconsin until Grover Cleveland won the state in 1892. No Democratic presidential candidate would again win a majority of Wisconsin’s popular vote until Franklin D. Roosevelt in 1932.

Results

See also
 United States presidential elections in Wisconsin

References

Wisconsin
1852 Wisconsin elections
1852